The 1925 USC Trojans football team was an American football team that represented the University of Southern California (USC) as a member of the Pacific Coast Conference (PCC) during the 1925 PCC football season. In its first year under head coach Howard Jones, the team compiled an 11–2 record (3–2 against PCC opponents), finished third in the PCC, and outscored opponents by a total of 456 to 55.

USC had only one road game during the 1925 season, its first (and only) trip to Moscow, Idaho, to play the 1925 Idaho Vandals.

Four USC players received first-team honors on the 1925 All-Pacific Coast football teams selected by the United Press (UP), Andy Smith (AS), Pop Warner (PW), and Norman E. Brown (NB): halfback Morley Drury (UP-1; AS-1; PW-1); end Hobbs Adams (UP-1; NB-1); guard Brice Taylor (UP-1; NB-1); and center Jeff Cravath (UP-1; PW-1).

Schedule

References

USC
USC Trojans football seasons
USC Trojans football